Kalluri is an Indian surname:

 Kalluri Chandramouli, was a freedom fighter, philanthropist, scholar and a great devotee.

Surnames of Indian origin
Kalluri veerababu, is from  srikakulam, Tekkali,AP. Studying at IIIT Ongole.